HXL may refer to:

 Hexcel (stock ticker: HXL), an American materials company
 BelgiumExel (ICAO code: HXL), a defunct Belgian airline
 HollandExel (ICAO code: HXL), a defunct Dutch airline
 DutchCaribbeanExel (ICAO code: HXL), a defunct Dutch airline
 Guangzhou–Shenzhen–Hong Kong Express Rail Link (HXL)
 Laarwald Grenze train station (station code: HXL), a Deutsche Bahn station

See also

 HX1 (disambiguation)